Phaseolus pauciflorus is a species of wild bean native to Mexico and Guatemala.

Taxonomy
The name Phaseolus pauciflorus has been used to represent at least 3 different species. Other species that have previously been called Phaseolus pauciflorus include Vigna dalzelliana (P. pauciflorus Dalzell) and Strophostyles leiosperma (Torr. & A. Gray) Piper (P. pauciflorus Benth.)

References

pauciflorus
Plants described in 1832
Taxa named by Martín Sessé y Lacasta
Taxa named by José Mariano Mociño
Taxa named by George Don